The Guaratiba Group is a geological group of the Santos Basin offshore of the Brazilian states of Rio de Janeiro, São Paulo, Paraná and Santa Catarina. The group forms the pre-salt layer in the petroleum-rich basin and hosts the biggest oil fields of Brazil, as Tupi, Júpiter and many more. The group contains, depending on the definition, three to four formations and dates to the Early Cretaceous period; Hauterivian to Early Aptian epochs.

Etymology 
The formation is named after Guaratiba, a neighbourhood in the west of Rio de Janeiro.

Description 

Subdivision 

Piçarras Formation
The formation includes reddish polymictic conglomerates, with clasts of basalt and quartz in a clay-sandy matrix. It also includes white, reddish lacustrine coquinas (shelly limestones) and sandstones, siltstones and shales of stevensite composition. Its age, based on the ostracod assemblages, is Hauterivian to Aptian.

The conglomerates and sandstones of the formation are representative of an alluvial environment. The coquinas represent a shallow lacustrine environment. Similar to the Atafona Formation of the Campos Basin, the sandstones, stevensite-bearing siltstones and shales represent an alkaline lacustrine environment affected by volcanic activity. The shales represent deeper lacustrine waters in more distal areas. The alternation of the two facies implies a series of alluvial progradation-retractions into the Early Cretaceous carbonate lakes. The low textural and compositional maturity of conglomerates and sandstones implies the basin was supplied from areas close to the basin margins.

Itapema Formation
The Itapema Formation is several hundreds of metres thick and consists of calcirudites (limestones) and dark shales. The calcirudite limestones consist of fragmented bivalve shells, frequently dolomitized and silicified. In more distal sections, the formation consists of dark organic matter rich shales. In the well 1-RSJ-625, the formation includes  of radioactive shales interbedded with carbonates. These facies are thought to represent a lacustrine environment. The organic matter-rich shales are one of the main source rocks of the Santos Basin. This formation is correlative with the Coqueiros Formation in the Campos Basin. The age of the Itapema Formation is Barremian to Aptian.

Barra Velha Formation
In the proximal sections, the formation comprises limestones of stromatolites and laminated microbialites. In the distal sections, it is composed of shales. Interbedded with the laminated microbialites there are limestones with packstone and grainstone textures made up of algal clasts and bioclasts (fragmented ostracods). The carbonates frequently are partly or completely dolomitized. These facies represent a transitional continental and shallow marine environment. The age of this formation has been estimated to be Late Barremian to Aptian. It is correlative with the Macabu Formation in the Campos Basin, as both are typified by laminated microbialites and stromatolites. These limestones are one of the sub-salt reservoirs in the Santos Basin, most notably of the giant Tupi and initially reported as supergiant Lapa Fields.

Petroleum geology 
The formation hosts the important pre-salt reservoir rocks of the Santos Basin.

See also 
 Campos Basin
 Pre-salt layer

References

Bibliography 
 
 
 
 
 
 
 

Geologic groups of South America
Geologic formations of Brazil
Santos Basin
Cretaceous Brazil
Lower Cretaceous Series of South America
Aptian Stage
Barremian Stage
Hauterivian Stage
Limestone formations
Conglomerate formations
Marl formations
Sandstone formations
Shale formations
Siltstone formations
Alluvial deposits
Lacustrine deposits
Shallow marine deposits
Reservoir rock formations
Source rock formations
Petroleum in Brazil
Formations
Formations
Formations
Formations
Tupi–Guarani languages